James Murphy (29 September 1911 – 7 May 1984) was an Australian cricketer. He played four first-class matches for New South Wales in 1938/39.

See also
 List of New South Wales representative cricketers

References

External links
 

1911 births
1984 deaths
Australian cricketers
New South Wales cricketers
People from the South Coast (New South Wales)
Cricketers from New South Wales